The Chamber of Deputies of the Kingdom of Italy was the main legislative body of the Kingdom of Italy descended from the lower house of the Kingdom of Sardinia, but supplemented with deputies from territories captured during the Second Italian War of Independence and the Expedition of the Thousand. Along with the Senate of the Kingdom of Italy, it formed the Parliament of the Kingdom of Italy from 1861 until 1939.

History
Its electors were initially selected by wealth and then by literacy, before the introduction of universal suffrage for all men over 21 in 1919. It was elected using a system that was based on both majorities and proportionality. 

It was based in the Palazzo Carignano in Turin (1861–1865), the Palazzo Vecchio in Florence (1865–1871), and finally the Palazzo Montecitorio (1871–1939). It was formed at the same time as the Kingdom of Italy in 1861, though its first sitting is known as the 8th Legislature of the Kingdom of Italy, since the 1st to 7th Legislatures are those of the Kingdom of Sardinia.

Its last sitting was the 29th Legislature of the Kingdom of Italy, which ended in 1939 when the Chamber voted to dissolve itself and replace itself with the Chamber of Fasces and Corporations.

See also
List of presidents of the Chamber of Deputies (Italy)

Bibliography
 Francesco Bartolotta (ed), Parlamenti e governi d'Italia dal 1848 al 1970, Roma, Vito Bianco Ed., 1971.

Italian Parliament
Defunct lower houses
1861 establishments in Italy
1939 disestablishments in Italy